Environmental protection is the practice of protecting the natural environment by individuals, organizations and governments. Its objectives are to conserve natural resources and the existing natural environment and, where possible, to repair damage and reverse trends.

Due to the pressures of overconsumption, population growth and technology, the biophysical environment is being degraded, sometimes permanently. This has been recognized, and governments have begun placing restraints on activities that cause environmental degradation. Since the 1960s, environmental movements have created more awareness of the multiple environmental problems. There is disagreement on the extent of the environmental impact of human activity, so protection measures are occasionally debated.

Approaches to environmental protection

Voluntary environmental agreements
In industrial countries, voluntary environmental agreements often provide a platform for companies to be recognized for moving beyond the minimum regulatory standards and thus support the development of the best environmental practice. For instance, in India, Environment Improvement Trust (EIT) has been working for environmental and forest protection since 1998. In developing countries, such as Latin America, these agreements are more commonly used to remedy significant levels of non-compliance with mandatory regulation.

Ecosystems approach
An ecosystems approach to resource management and environmental protection aims to consider the complex interrelationships of an entire ecosystem in decision making rather than simply responding to specific issues and challenges. Ideally, the decision-making processes under such an approach would be a collaborative approach to planning and decision making that involves a broad range of stakeholders across all relevant governmental departments, as well as industry representatives, environmental groups, and community. This approach ideally supports a better exchange of information, development of conflict-resolution strategies and improved regional conservation. Religions also play an important role in the conservation of the environment.

International environmental agreements

Many of the earth's resources are especially vulnerable because they are influenced by human impacts across different countries. As a result of this, many attempts are made by countries to develop agreements that are signed by multiple governments to prevent damage or manage the impacts of human activity on natural resources. This can include agreements that impact factors such as climate, oceans, rivers and air pollution. These international environmental agreements are sometimes legally binding documents that have legal implications when they are not followed and, at other times, are more agreements in principle or are for use as codes of conduct. These agreements have a long history with some multinational agreements being in place from as early as 1910 in Europe, America and Africa. 

Many of the international technical agencies formed after 1945 addressed environmental themes. By the late 1960s, a growing environmental movement called for coordinated and institutionalized international cooperation. The landmark United Nations Conference on the Human Environment was held in Stockholm in 1972, establishing the concept of a right to a healthy environment. It was followed by the creation of the United Nations Environment Programme later that year. Some of the most well-known international agreements include the Kyoto Protocol of 1997 and the Paris Agreement of 2015.

On 8 October 2021, the UN Human Rights Council passed a resolution recognizing access to a healthy and sustainable environment as a universal right. In the resolution 48/13, the Council called on States around the world to work together, and with other partners, to implement the newly recognized right.

On 28 July 2022, the United Nations General Assembly voted to declare the ability to live in “a clean, healthy and sustainable environment” a universal human right. UN High Commissioner for Human Rights Michelle Bachelet hailed the decision and called for urgent action to make it a reality for all.

Government

Discussion concerning environmental protection often focuses on the role of government, legislation, and law enforcement. However, in its broadest sense, environmental protection may be seen to be the responsibility of all the people and not simply that of government. Decisions that impact the environment will ideally involve a broad range of stakeholders including industry, indigenous groups, environmental group and community representatives. Gradually, environmental decision-making processes are evolving to reflect this broad base of stakeholders and are becoming more collaborative in many countries.

Tanzania 
Many constitutions acknowledge Tanzania as having some of the greatest biodiversity of any African country. Almost 40% of the land has been established into a network of protected areas, including several national parks. The concerns for the natural environment include damage to ecosystems and loss of habitat resulting from population growth, expansion of subsistence agriculture, pollution, timber extraction and significant use of timber as fuel.

Environmental protection in Tanzania began during the German occupation of East Africa (1884–1919)—colonial conservation laws for the protection of game and forests were enacted, whereby restrictions were placed upon traditional indigenous activities such as hunting, firewood collecting, and cattle grazing. In 1948, Serengeti has officially established the first national park for wild cats in East Africa. Since 1983, there has been a more broad-reaching effort to manage environmental issues at a national level, through the establishment of the National Environment Management Council (NEMC) and the development of an environmental act.

Division of the biosphere is the main government body that oversees protection. It does this through the formulation of policy, coordinating and monitoring environmental issues, environmental planning and policy-oriented environmental research. The National Environment Management Council (NEMC) is an institution that was initiated when the National Environment Management Act was first introduced in year 1983. This council has the role to advise governments and the international community on a range of environmental issues. The NEMC the following purposes: provide technical advice; coordinate technical activities; develop enforcement guidelines and procedures; assess, monitor and evaluate activities that impact the environment; promote and assist environmental information and communication; and seek advancement of scientific knowledge.

The National Environment Policy of 1997 acts as a framework for environmental decision making in Tanzania. The policy objectives are to achieve the following:
 Ensure sustainable and equitable use of resources without degrading the environment or risking health or safety.
 Prevent and control degradation of land, water, vegetation and air.
 Conserve and enhance natural and man-made heritage, including biological diversity of unique ecosystems.
 Improve condition and productivity of degraded areas.
 Raise awareness and understanding of the link between environment and development.
 Promote individual and community participation.
 Promote international cooperation.
 Use ecofriendly resources.

Tanzania is a signatory to a significant number of international conventions including the Rio Declaration on Development and Environment 1992 and the Convention on Biological Diversity 1996. The Environmental Management Act, 2004, is the first comprehensive legal and institutional framework to guide environmental-management decisions. The policy tools that are parts of the act include the use of environmental-impact assessments, strategics environmental assessments, and taxation on pollution for specific industries and products. The effectiveness of shifting of this act will only become clear over time as concerns regarding its implementation become apparent based on the fact that, historically, there has been a lack of capacity to enforce environmental laws and a lack of working tools to bring environmental-protection objectives into practice.

China

Formal environmental protection in China House was first stimulated by the 1972 United Nations Conference on the Human Environment held in Stockholm, Sweden. Following this, they began establishing environmental protection agencies and putting controls on some of its industrial waste. China was one of the first developing countries to implement a sustainable development strategy. In 1983 the State Council announced that environmental protection would be one of China's basic national policies and in 1984 the National Environmental Protection Agency (NEPA) was established. Following severe flooding of the Yangtze River basin in 1998, NEPA was upgraded to the State Environmental Protection Agency (SEPA) meaning that environmental protection was now being implemented at a ministerial level. In 2008, SEPA became known by its current name of Ministry of Environmental Protection of the People's Republic of China (MEP).

Environmental pollution and ecological degradation has resulted in economic losses for China. In 2005, economic losses (mainly from air pollution) were calculated at 7.7% of China's GDP. This grew to 10.3% by 2002 and the economic loss from water pollution (6.1%) began to exceed that caused by air pollution.
China has been one of the top performing countries in terms of GDP growth (9.64% in the past ten years). However, the high economic growth has put immense pressure on its environment and the environmental challenges that China faces are greater than most countries. In 2010 China was ranked 121st out of 163 countries on the Environmental Performance Index.

China has taken initiatives to increase its protection of the environment and combat environmental degradation:
 China's investment in renewable energy grew 18% in 2007 to $15.6 billion, accounting for ~10% of the global investment in this area;
 In 2008, spending on the environment was 1.49% of GDP, up 3.4 times from 2000;
 The discharge of CO (carbon monoxide) and SO2 (sulfur dioxide) decreased by 6.61% and 8.95% in 2008 compared with that in 2005;
 China's protected nature reserves have increased substantially. In 1978 there were only 34 compared with 2,538 in 2010. The protected nature reserve system now occupies 15.5% of the country; this is higher than the world average.

Rapid growth in GDP has been China's main goal during the past three decades with a dominant development model of inefficient resource use and high pollution to achieve high GDP. For China to develop sustainably, environmental protection should be treated as an integral part of its economic policies.

Quote from Shengxian Zhou, head of MEP (2009): "Good economic policy is good environmental policy and the nature of environmental problem is the economic structure, production form and develop model."

European Union
Environmental protection has become an important task for the institutions of the European Community after the Maastricht Treaty for the European Union ratification by all of its member states. The EU is active in the field of environmental policy, issuing directives such as those on environmental impact assessment and on access to environmental information for citizens in the member states.

Ireland
The Environmental Protection Agency, Ireland (EPA) has a wide range of functions to protect the environment, with its primary responsibilities including:
 Environmental licensing
 Enforcement of environmental law
 Environmental planning, education, and guidance
 Monitoring, analyzing and reporting on the environment
 Regulating Ireland's greenhouse gas emissions
 Environmental research development
 Strategic environmental assessment
 Waste management
 Radiological protection

Middle East
The Middle Eastern countries become part of the joint Islamic environmental action, which was initiated in 2002 in Jeddah. Under the Islamic Educational, Scientific and Cultural Organization, the member states join the Islamic Environment Ministers Conference in every two years, focusing on the importance of environment protection and sustainable development. The Arab countries are also awarded the title of best environment management in the Islamic world.

In August 2019, the Sultanate of Oman won the award for 2018–19 in Saudi Arabia, citing its project "Verifying the Age and Growth of Spotted Small Spots in the Northwest Coast of the Sea of Oman".

Russia
In Russia, environmental protection is considered an integral part of national safety. The Federal Ministry of Natural Resources and Ecology is the authorized state body tasked with managing environmental protection. However, there are a lot of environmental issues in Russia.

Latin America
The United Nations Environment Programme (UNEP) has identified 17 megadiverse countries. The list includes six Latin American countries: Brazil, Colombia, Ecuador, Mexico, Peru and Venezuela. Mexico and Brazil stand out among the rest because they have the largest area, population and number of species. These countries represent a major concern for environmental protection because they have high rates of deforestation, ecosystems loss, pollution, and population growth.

Brazil

Brazil has the largest amount of the world's tropical forests, 4,105,401 km2 (48.1% of Brazil), concentrated in the Amazon region. Brazil is home to vast biological diversity, first among the megadiverse countries of the world, having between 15%-20% of the 1.5 million globally described species.

The organization in charge of environment protection is the Brazilian Ministry of the Environment (in Portuguese: Ministério do Meio Ambiente, MMA). It was first created in the year 1973 with the name Special Secretariat for the Environment (Secretaria Especial de Meio Ambiente), changing names several times, and adopting the final name in the year 1999. The Ministry is responsible for addressing the following issues:
 A national policy for the environment and for water resources;
 A policy for the preservation, conservation and sustainable use of ecosystems, biodiversity, and forests;
 Proposing strategies, mechanisms, economic and social instruments for improving environmental quality, and sustainable use of natural resources;
 Policies for integrating production and the environment;
 Environmental policies and programs for the Legal Amazon;
 Ecological and economic territorial zoning.

In 2011, protected areas of the Amazon covered 2,197,485 km2 (an area larger than Greenland), with conservation units, like national parks, accounting for just over half (50.6%) and indigenous territories representing the remaining 49.4%.

Mexico

With over 200,000 different species, Mexico is home to 10–12% of the world's biodiversity, ranking first in reptile biodiversity and second in mammals—one estimate indicates that over 50% of all animal and plant species live in Mexico.

The history of environmental policy in Mexico started in the 1940s with the enactment of the Law of Conservation of Soil and Water (in Spanish: Ley de Conservación de Suelo y Agua). Three decades later, at the beginning of the 1970s, the Law to Prevent and Control Environmental Pollution was created (Ley para Prevenir y Controlar la Contaminación Ambiental).

In the year 1972 was the first direct response from the federal government to address eminent health effects from environmental issues. It established the administrative organization of the Secretariat for the Improvement of the Environment (Subsecretaría para el Mejoramiento del Ambiente) in the Department of Health and Welfare.

The Secretariat of Environment and Natural Resources (Secretaría del Medio Ambiente y Recursos Naturales, SEMARNAT) is Mexico's environment ministry. The Ministry is responsible for addressing the following issues:
 Promote the protection, restoration, and conservation of ecosystems, natural resources, goods, and environmental services and facilitate their use and sustainable development.
 Develop and implement a national policy on natural resources
 Promote environmental management within the national territory, in coordination with all levels of government and the private sector.
 Evaluate and provide determination to the environmental impact statements for development projects and prevention of ecological damage
 Implement national policies on climate change and protection of the ozone layer.
 Direct work and studies on national meteorological, climatological, hydrological, and geohydrological systems, and participate in international conventions on these subjects.
 Regulate and monitor the conservation of waterways

In November 2000 there were 127 protected areas; currently there are 174, covering an area of 25,384,818 hectares, increasing federally protected areas from 8.6% to 12.85% of its land area.

Oceania

Australia

In 2008, there was 98,487,116 ha of terrestrial protected area, covering 12.8% of the land area of Australia. The 2002 figures of 10.1% of terrestrial area and 64,615,554 ha of protected marine area were found to poorly represent about half of Australia's 85 bioregions.

Environmental protection in Australia could be seen as starting with the formation of the first national park, Royal National Park, in 1879. More progressive environmental protection had it start in the 1960s and 1970s with major international programs such as the United Nations Conference on the Human Environment in 1972, the Environment Committee of the OECD in 1970, and the United Nations Environment Programme of 1972. These events laid the foundations by increasing public awareness and support for regulation. State environmental legislation was irregular and deficient until the Australian Environment Council (AEC) and Council of Nature Conservation Ministers (CONCOM) were established in 1972 and 1974, creating a forum to assist in coordinating environmental and conservation policies between states and neighbouring countries. These councils have since been replaced by the Australian and New Zealand Environment and Conservation Council (ANZECC) in 1991 and finally the Environment Protection and Heritage Council (EPHC) in 2001.

At a national level, the Environment Protection and Biodiversity Conservation Act 1999 is the primary environmental protection legislation for the Commonwealth of Australia. It concerns matters of national and international environmental significance regarding flora, fauna, ecological communities and cultural heritage. It also has jurisdiction over any activity conducted by the Commonwealth, or affecting it, that has significant environmental impact.
The act covers eight main areas:
 National Heritage Sites
 World Heritage Sites
 Ramsar wetlands
 Nationally endangered or threatened species and ecological communities
 Nuclear activities and actions
 Great Barrier Reef Marine Park
 Migratory species
 Commonwealth marine areas

There are several Commonwealth protected lands due to partnerships with traditional native owners, such as Kakadu National Park, extraordinary biodiversity such as Christmas Island National Park, or managed cooperatively due to cross-state location, such as the Australian Alps National Parks and Reserves.

At a state level, the bulk of environmental protection issues are left to the responsibility of the state or territory. Each state in Australia has its own environmental protection legislation and corresponding agencies. Their jurisdiction is similar and covers point source pollution, such as from industry or commercial activities, land/water use, and waste management. Most protected lands are managed by states and territories with state legislative acts creating different degrees and definitions of protected areas such as wilderness, national land and marine parks, state forests, and conservation areas. States also create regulation to limit and provide general protection from air, water, and sound pollution.

At a local level, each city or regional council has responsibility over issues not covered by state or national legislation. This includes non-point source, or diffuse pollution, such as sediment pollution from construction sites.

Australia ranks second place on the UN 2010 Human Development Index and one of the lowest debt to GDP ratios of the developed economies. This could be seen as coming at the cost of the environment, with Australia being the world leader in coal exportation and species extinctions. Some have been motivated to proclaim it is Australia's responsibility to set the example of environmental reform for the rest of the world to follow.

New Zealand
At a national level, the Ministry for the Environment is responsible for environmental policy and the Department of Conservation addresses conservation issues. At a regional level the regional councils administer the legislation and address regional environmental issues.

Switzerland

The environmental protection in Switzerland is mainly based on the measures to be taken against global warming. The pollution in Switzerland is mainly the pollution caused by vehicles and the litteration by tourists.

United States

Since 1970, the United States Environmental Protection Agency (EPA) has been working to protect the environment and human health.

The Environmental Protection Agency (EPA) is an independent executive agency of the United States federal government tasked with environmental protection matters.

All US states have their own state-level departments of environmental protection, which may issue regulations more stringent than the federal ones.

In January 2010, EPA Administrator Lisa P. Jackson published via the official EPA blog her "Seven Priorities for EPA's Future", which were (in the order originally listed):
 Taking action on climate change
 Improving air quality
 Assuring the safety of chemicals
 Cleaning up [US] communities
 Protecting America's waters
 Expanding the conversation on environmentalism and working for environmental justice
 Building strong state and tribal partnerships
 it is unclear whether these still represent the agency's active priorities, as Jackson departed in February 2013, and the page has not been updated in the interim.

India
The Constitution of India has a number of provisions demarcating the responsibility of the Central and State governments towards Environmental Protection. The state's responsibility with regard to environmental protection has been laid down under article 48-A of our constitution which stated that "The states shall endeavor to protect and improve the environment and to safeguard the forest and wildlife of the country".

Environmental protection has been made a fundamental duty of every citizen of India under Article 51-A (g) of the constitution which says "It shall be the duty of every citizen of India to protect and improve the natural environment including forests, lakes, rivers, and wildlife and to have compassion for living creatures".

Article 21 of the constitution is a fundamental right, which states that "No person shall be deprived of his life or personal liberty except according to the procedure established by law".

In literature
There are numerous works of literature that contain the themes of environmental protection but some have been fundamental to its evolution. Several pieces such as A Sand County Almanac by Aldo Leopold, "Tragedy of the commons" by Garrett Hardin, and Silent Spring by Rachel Carson have become classics due to their far reaching influences. The conservationist and Nobel laureate Wangari Muta Maathai devoted her 2010 book Replenishing the Earth to the Green Belt Movement and the vital importance of trees in protecting the environment.

The subject of environmental protection is present in fiction as well as non-fictional literature. Books such as Antarctica and Blockade have environmental protection as subjects whereas The Lorax has become a popular metaphor for environmental protection. "The Limits of Trooghaft" by Desmond Stewart is a short story that provides insight into human attitudes towards animals. Another book called The Martian Chronicles by Ray Bradbury investigates issues such as bombs, wars, government control, and what effects these can have on the environment.

See also

 Anti-consumerism
 Anti-environmentalism
 Biodiversity
 Biocentrism (ethics)
 Carbon offset
 Citizen Science, cleanup projects that people can take part in.
 Conservation biology
 Conservation movement
 Earth Day
 Environmentalism
 Environmental education
 Environmental globalization
 Environmental governance
 Environmental law
 Environmental movement
 Environmental organizations
 Environmental personhood
 Environmental racism
 Green politics
 Green solutions
 List of environmental organizations
 List of environmental issues
 List of environmental topics
 List of international environmental agreements
 Natural capital
 Natural resource management
 Nature conservation
 Proforestation
 Sustainability
 Climate change mitigation
 Greening

References

External links
 

 

ltg:Apleicsardzeiba
hu:Természetvédelem